Splitrock is a house in Austin, Texas, built in 1893 by a Scottish immigrant named Robert F Burns. Located at 2815 Wooldridge Dr. (30.298753, -97.750397) on bluffs overlooking Shoal Creek, the house was one of the first in the central Austin area which is now occupied by the Pemberton Heights and Bryker Woods neighborhoods. In 2006 Splitrock was designated as a City of Austin Historic Landmark. The house also referred to as the “Burns-Klein” house is a contributing property to the Old West Austin National Register Historic District.

References

External links
City of Austin approval for Historic Landmark Designation
Historic Landmark Application

Houses completed in 1893
Houses in Austin, Texas
Historic district contributing properties in Texas
National Register of Historic Places in Austin, Texas
Houses on the National Register of Historic Places in Texas